Kirkton is a small village between Duncow and Dumfries in Dumfries and Galloway, Scotland. It is located near the River Nith and has a church.

References

Villages in Dumfries and Galloway